Stock Tank Oil refers to the volume of oil after flashing to nominal atmospheric (or other stated) storage pressure and temperature (as opposed to reservoir conditions).

See also

 Oil in place

References

 www.oilgasglossary.com/stock_tank_oil.html

Petroleum industry
Petroleum production